Clemens Henricus "Clé" Jeltes (11 March 1924, The Hague3 July 2010 Nederhorst den Berg) was a Dutch sailor and measurer at seven Olympic games. He was heavily involved with the technical development of the Flying Dutchman and was the driving force to focus at boat measurement to the parameters that really matter. From 1968 until 1992 he was the International FD measurer at seven consecutive Olympic Games, making sure that the sailing took place in correct boats. He was appointed the Ridder in de Orde van Oranje Nassau in 2002 for, among other things, his services to sailing.

References

External links
 
 

1924 births
2010 deaths
Dutch male sailors (sport)
Sportspeople from The Hague
Knights of the Order of Orange-Nassau